BBC Radio Stoke is the BBC's local radio station serving Staffordshire and South Cheshire.

It broadcasts on FM, DAB, Freeview and via BBC Sounds from studios in the Hanley area of Stoke-on-Trent.

According to RAJAR, the station has a weekly audience of 117,000 listeners and an 8.6% share as of December 2022.

Overview
The station began broadcasting programmes on 14 March 1968 as BBC Radio Stoke-on-Trent.

Both of the English counties the station covers have no BBC local radio station for their whole area. In Staffordshire, the south is covered by BBC WM, east by BBC Radio Derby and the west by BBC Radio Shropshire. In Cheshire, north-western areas are served by BBC Radio Merseyside and the north-east by BBC Radio Manchester.

The station broadcasts from its studios on Cheapside in Hanley, the biggest of the six towns that make up the city of Stoke-on-Trent. There are also studios and offices in Crewe, Leek and Stafford. The station uses the frequencies of 94.6 MHz and 104.1 MHz FM, and is also available on the Stoke & Stafford DAB digital radio multiplex, Freeview TV channel 726 and via BBC Sounds.

The current Managing Editors are Alistair Miskin and Tim Beech.

Tuning details
FM

Transmitters
The  Alsagers Bank transmitter is two miles west of Newcastle-under-Lyme, close to the M6. Stations broadcast from it can be clearly heard in most parts of northern Birmingham, and along the M6 from the M54 junction to Skelmersdale. The transmitter also carries Signal 1 (a commercial station owned by Bauer), BBC National DAB and Digital One.

The 104.1 MHz frequency is heard in Stafford and the transmitter is on the roof of the County Education building in the town.

DAB signals come from the Stoke & Stafford 12D multiplex from Alsagers Bank, Pye Green (near Hednesford), Sutton Common (between Congleton and Macclesfield in Cheshire), and Tick Hill (strongest power, south-east of the junction of the A520 and A52 near the Foxfield Steam Railway between Cookshill and Godleybrook). The Sideway transmitter is right next to the A500 D Road, just south of the A50 junction.

Signal 1 (102.6 MHz) and Radio Stoke (94.6 MHz) are clear in most of the area except in some parts of the Staffordshire Moorlands (Cheadle in particular) and Stafford (which has its own relays).

Programming
Local programming is produced and broadcast from the BBC's Stoke-on-Trent studios from 6am – 10pm each day.

The station's late show, airing from 10pm-1am, originates from BBC Radio WM in Birmingham.

During the station's downtime, BBC Radio Stoke simulcasts overnight programming from BBC Radio 5 Live and BBC Radio London.

References

External links 
 BBC Radio Stoke
 BBC Radio Stoke coverage map 
 Alsagers Bank transmitter (including coverage map)
 David's Transmitter World
 Pye Green (Digital)
 Sideway transmitter 
 Sutton Common (Digital)

Audio clips
 2001 Jingle

Stoke
Radio stations in Cheshire
Mass media in Stoke-on-Trent
Radio stations established in 1968
Radio stations in Staffordshire